Tikiġaq School is a PreK-12 school in Point Hope, Alaska. It is a part of the North Slope Borough School District.

 it had 46 employees and 229 students. Half of the employees members were certified while the other half were classified.

History

 most of the principals only stay at the school for up to one year.

Athletics
The high-school boys' basketball team has won three consecutive Class 2-A Alaska championships. Basketball became popular before a gymnasium was built, and passing became important as dribbling was difficult on makeshift courts and on snow. An up-tempo, skillful passing game has characterized play since then by the Harpooners and Harponerettes, as the boys' and girls' teams are known, enabling them to beat rival schools from districts with much larger population bases.

References

Note
 Some material originated from Point Hope, Alaska

External links
 
 Profile from the Alaska Department of Education & Early Development

Public K-12 schools in Alaska
Schools in North Slope Borough, Alaska